Gănești may refer to several places in Romania:

Gănești, a commune in Mureș County
 Gănești, a village in Bistra Commune, Alba County
 Gănești, a village in Pietroșani Commune, Argeș County
 Gănești, a village in Cavadinești Commune, Galați County
 Gănești, a village in Ion Neculce Commune, Iași County
 Gănești, a village in Boțești Commune, Vaslui County
 Gănești, a village in Lăcusteni Commune, Vâlcea County